Dingup is a small town located on the Muirs Highway in the South West region of Western Australia.

References 

South West (Western Australia)